Leucopogon appressus  is a species of flowering plant in the heath family Ericaceae and is endemic to south-eastern New South Wales. It is a small, spreading to erect shrub with wiry stems, lance-shaped or narrowly egg-shaped to elliptic leaves and small white flowers.

Description
The upper surface of the leaves is concave and there is a long, fine point on the tip. The flowers are white and arranged singly in leaf axils in dense heads at the ends of branches.

Taxonomy
Leucopogon appressus was first formally described in 1810 by Robert Brown in his Prodromus Florae Novae Hollandiae. The specific epithet (appressus) means "pressed down", referring to the leaves pressed against the stem.

Distribution and habitat
Leucopogon appressus grows in heath and shrubby forest in soils derived from sandstone on the coast and nearby tablelands of New South Wales near Sydney and in the Wollemi National Park.

References

appressus
Ericales of Australia
Flora of New South Wales
Plants described in 1810
Taxa named by Robert Brown (botanist, born 1773)